Leninskoye is a rural locality (a village) in Kaltovsky Selsoviet, Iglinsky District, Bashkortostan, Russia. The population was 10 as of 2010.

Geography 
It is located 31 km from Iglino.

References 

Rural localities in Iglinsky District